Lieutenant General Sir Nicholas Arthur William Pope,  (born 1962) is a former senior British Army officer. He served as Master-General of the Ordnance from 2011 to 2013 and Deputy Chief of the General Staff from 2015 to 2019.

Early life and education
Pope was born in 1962. He was educated at Desborough School in Maidenhead, and Jesus College, Cambridge.

Military career
Pope was commissioned into the Royal Corps of Signals in 1981. He became Brigade Major at Headquarters, 19th Mechanised Brigade in 1997 and was deployed in that role to Bosnia. He was appointed Commanding Officer of 30th Signal Regiment in November 2000 and became Deputy Director of Defence Resources and Plans at the Ministry of Defence in late 2002. He went on to be Commander of 1st Signal Brigade at Rheindahlen in September 2005 and was subsequently deployed to Afghanistan.

He was appointed Strategic Communication Officer to the Chief of the Defence Staff in Spring 2011 and became Director of Battlefield Manoeuvre and Master-General of the Ordnance in November 2011. He became Director General Capability in October 2013, and Deputy Chief of the General Staff in December 2015.

Pope was appointed Knight Commander of the Order of the Bath (KCB) in the 2019 Birthday Honours.

References

 

|-

1962 births
Alumni of Jesus College, Cambridge
British Army generals
British Army personnel of the War in Afghanistan (2001–2021)
Commanders of the Order of the British Empire
Living people
NATO personnel in the Bosnian War
Royal Corps of Signals officers
Knights Commander of the Order of the Bath